Kale , also known as , is a retrograde irregular satellite of Jupiter.

It was named in August 2003 after Kale, one of the Charites ('Graces'), daughters of Zeus (Jupiter). Kale is the spouse of Hephaestus according to some authors (although most have Aphrodite play that role).

References

Carme group
Moons of Jupiter
Irregular satellites
Discoveries by Scott S. Sheppard
20011209
Discoveries by David C. Jewitt
Discoveries by Jan Kleyna
Moons with a retrograde orbit